Cognita is a global private schools group which owns and operates schools throughout the United Kingdom, Hong Kong, Singapore, Dubai, India, Spain, Italy, Switzerland, Thailand, Vietnam, Brazil, Colombia, Chile, Mexico and the United States. According to Cognita, its schools deliver 12 different curricula: National, International Baccalaureate, American (including American Education Reaches Out - Common Core Plus and Advanced Placement), Australian, Spanish, Chilean, Colombian, Mexican, Indian, Swiss, Italian and Brazilian.

Cognita was founded by the late Chris Woodhead, previously Her Majesty's Chief Inspector of Schools in England. According to Cognita, it employs 15,000 staff and educates over 75,000 children.  Jacobs Holding is the majority owner and the Jacobs Foundation is the sole economic beneficiary of the firm's investments.

The Group Chief Executive Officer of Cognita is Frank Maassen.

History
Cognita was formed in October 2004 by its founder management team and Englefield Capital, a private equity firm, now called Bregal Capital, and its former chairman, Sir Chris Woodhead, the former Chief Inspector of Schools in England. From 2004 Cognita started operating its first school, Quinton House School in Northampton. Later in 2004, Cognita acquired the Asquith Court Group, bringing a further 18 schools into the group. From 2004 until 2007, they continued to buy independent schools within the UK.

In 2007, Cognita spread internationally acquiring schools in Spain and Singapore. Cognita established its first school from inception in 2009, Stamford American International School in Singapore. Also in this year, a group of three international schools were purchased in Thailand. Schools in Vietnam joined Cognita in 2011, and in 2012, Cognita bought their first school in South America, in Brazil.

In August 2012, Cognita questioned the financial viability of its Ffynone House School in Swansea. Following lobbying and negotiation by parents and staff of the school, Cognita agreed to surrender the school to its lessor, Ffynone House School charitable trust, from which Cognita had leased the school. Cognita paid the trust £535,000 as a surrender sum and 10 years rent in advance of £270,000 and the school continues to operate with an operating surplus.

On 6 May 2013, the formerly majority British-owned company Cognita agreed to be invested in by the American private equity firm KKR Kohlberg Kravis Roberts L.P. In June 2013, Cognita expanded its network of Latin American schools through a partnership with Desarrollos Educacionales (DDEE), a Chilean private schools group operating nine national curriculum day schools under the Pumahue and Manquecura brands.

In April 2014, Cognita transferred ownership of Ferndale Preparatory School, Faringdon, Oxfordshire, to Ferndale Preparatory School Limited, a parent-led consortium.  This filed for administration on 22 July 2016 due to lack of pupil numbers and funding issues, leaving staff redundant. In December 2014, Cognita acquired Instituto GayLussac in Niteroi, Brazil.

In March 2016, Cognita started a school from inception in Chile with the opening of Colegio Pumahue Chicauma. Also in 2016, International School of Barcelona, the English Montessori School in Spain, and St. Andrews International School, Dusit in Thailand joined Cognita: .

In September 2017, Cognita opened Stamford American School in Hong Kong. In the same month it opened the Early Learning Village in Singapore with more than 2,000 places. In November 2017, Cognita announced it would be expanding Downsend School in Leatherhead, UK to include a Senior School from September 2020.

In January 2018, Cognita opened a second campus for International School Ho Chi Minh City in Vietnam. In March 2018, The American British School in Chile joined Cognita. In May 2018, Cognita opened BSB Nexus in Spain, a new pre-university campus which is part of The British School of Barcelona. In the same month, Woodland Pre-Schools in Hong Kong joined the Cognita group.  On 3 September 2018, global investment firms Bregal Investments and KKR announced the signing of a binding agreement for the sale of Cognita to Jacobs Holding of Switzerland, due to complete in the fourth quarter of 2018, subject to customary regulatory approvals. Also in September 2018, Santo Tomás School, in Ñuñoa, Metropolitan Region, Santiago de Chile, joined Cognita.

In November 2018 and January 2019 respectively, Colegio Europeo de Madrid (CEM) and the British School of Valencia in Spain joined Cognita and became the group's sixth and seventh schools in Spain.

In January 2019, BDT Capital Partners and Sofina became minority owners of Cognita, with Jacobs remaining as majority owner. In February 2019, Colegio San Francisco Javier Huechuraba became Cognita's 13th school in Chile. In July 2019, International School Zurich North joined Cognita, becoming its first school in Switzerland and 74th school globally. In September 2019, Colegio Maxi became Cognita's third school in Brazil. In November 2019, Chirec International School in Hyderabad became Cognita's 1st school in India, and 76th school globally. In December 2019, Centro Educacional Pingo de Gente & Laviniense joined Cognita.

UK independent school Brighton College opened an international school in Singapore with Cognita in August 2020. In September 2020, Mirasur International School in Spain became a Cognita school. 

Cognita acquired The Greenland School in Santiago, Chile, in January 2021 and Escola Villare in Brazil in February 2021. In March 2021, Horizon English School became part of Cognita. Obersee Bilingual School in Switzerland and Kindergarten Bilingual School of Florence became part of Cognita in May 2021. 

In September 2021, Royal Grammar School Guildford Dubai opened its doors for the first time and Ranches Primary School in Dubai also joined Cognita.  

Colegio Internacional Meres in Asturias, Spain,  and Horizon International School in Dubai  became part of Cognita in February 2022. Dunalastair Schools in Chile joined in May 2022, followed by a strategic alliance with Colegio Olinca in Mexico City marking Cognita's first entry to Mexico. 

In September 2022, York Prep School in New York City became the first school to join Cognita in North America.

A strategic alliance with nine Redcol schools in June 2022 marked Cognita's first entry to Colombia.

Controversies
Cognita was accused of pension irregularities in 2012. In 2012, Cognita staff were instructed to impersonate parents and take tours of competing schools in Wales. This conduct was defended as a "normal" way of assessing the competition.

In 2012, Judge Robert Reid QC ruled that the Cognita-owned Milbourne Lodge in Esher, Surrey, had acted unfairly in removing two children, aged eight and six, without warning after the children's parents criticized the school's parents' association, the Friends of Milbourne Lodge, for lack of transparency in its fundraising and spending. The judge said that the parents' association was "somewhat shadowy" and a "shambles".

Cognita's management of Southbank International School was criticised in 2011, with parents groups claiming it had "no serious interest in maximising the educational experience of ... children if it impacts on their bottom line". Then Chairman Chris Woodhead denied the allegations, claiming that its profits were in line with others in the sector.

In 2014, the same school was accused of inadequately vetting staff after a former teacher, William Vahey, was found to have abused pupils over several years. In an article in The Guardian, the school's incoming chairman of governors, Sir Chris Woodhead was interviewed: "The school said it had carried out checks dating back 17 years on Vahey, who had taught in international schools in eight countries. But they did not pick up on a 1969 conviction for child molestation in California. Vahey's CV showed he had been registered as a teacher in the state of New Jersey in 1986, and Woodhead said it was reasonable to have assumed that would not have been the case if he had been convicted of child molestation. 'The system in America broke down,' he said." Regulatory and statutory bodies have since praised the transformation of safeguarding practices and processes in the school as "comprehensive and robust".

Parents at Cognita's Saint Andrews Sukhumvit 107 School in Bangkok, Thailand, prepared a petition containing an open email to Sir Chris Woodhead in 2012, alleging lack of transparency and a disdain for parental views following a decision by Brian Rogove, Cognita's former Asia Pacific CEO, to change the leadership of the school.

In 2012, Cognita's director of education, Geraint Jones, was quoted as saying "13 weeks' paid holiday is enough compensation for hard work during term time" and that "teachers have a duty to go beyond their classroom duties", indicating that putting up wall displays, collecting dinner money, performing lunch duties and providing cover are vital tasks of the teaching job and should not be delegated to assistants. Jones also criticised the inefficiency of state schools, saying "it makes me sick".

List of schools

United Kingdom
 Akeley Wood Senior School, Buckingham, Buckinghamshire
 Akeley Wood Junior School, Milton Keynes, Buckinghamshire
 Breaside Preparatory School, Bromley, London
 Charterhouse Square School, Islington, London
 Clifton Lodge School, Ealing, London
 Colchester High School, Colchester, Essex
 Cumnor House School for Boys, South Croydon, London
 Cumnor House School for Girls, Purley, London
 Downsend School, Leatherhead, Surrey
 Downsend Pre-Preparatory School Leatherhead, Surrey
 Downsend Pre-Preparatory School, Ashtead, Surrey
 Downsend Pre-Preparatory School, Epsom, Surrey
 Duncombe School, Hertford, Hertfordshire
 Glenesk School, East Horsley, Surrey
 Hendon Preparatory School, Hendon, London
 Huddersfield Grammar School, Huddersfield, West Yorkshire
 Hydesville Tower School, Walsall, West Midlands
 King's School, Plymouth, Plymouth, Devon
 Kingscourt School, Catherington, Hampshire
 Long Close School, Slough, Berkshire
 Meoncross School, Fareham, Hampshire
 Milbourne Lodge School, Esher, Surrey
 North Bridge House Nursery School, London
 North Bridge House Pre-Preparatory School, London
 North Bridge House Preparatory School, London
 North Bridge House Senior School Hampstead, London
 North Bridge House Senior School & Sixth Form, London
 Oakfields Montessori School, Upminster, London
 Oakleigh House School, Swansea, Wales
 Oxford House School, Colchester, Essex
 Polam School, Bedford, Bedfordshire
 Prince's Gardens Preparatory School, Westminster, London
 Quinton House School, Northampton, Northamptonshire
 St Clare's School, Porthcawl|St Clare's School, Porthcawl, Wales
 St Margaret's Preparatory School, Gosfield, Essex
 St Mary's School, Henley-on-Thames, Oxfordshire
 St Nicholas Preparatory School, Kensington, London
 Salcombe Preparatory School, Southgate, London
 Southbank International School Westminster, London
 Southbank International School Kensington, London
 Southbank International School Hampstead, London

Spain
 Colegio Europeo de Madrid, Madrid
 Hastings School of Madrid, Madrid
 The English Montessori School, Madrid
 British School of Barcelona, Barcelona
 El Limonar International School, Murcia, Murcia
 El Limonar International School, Villamartin, Villamartin
 British School of Valencia, Valencia
 Mirasur International School, Pinto, Madrid
 Colegio Internacional Meres, Asturias

Switzerland
 International School – Zurich North, Zurich
 Obersee Bilingual School, Wollerau

Singapore
 Australian International School, Serangoon Gardens
 Stamford American International School, Serangoon
 Brighton College Singapore, co-located with Australian International School and Stamford American International School, opening in August 2020

Hong Kong
 Stamford American School, Kowloon
 Woodland Pre-Schools

Thailand
 St. Andrews International School, Rayong, Rayong
 St. Andrews International School, Sathorn, Bangkok
 St. Andrews International School, Sukhumvit 107, Bangkok
 St. Andrews International School, Dusit, Bangkok

Vietnam
 International School Ho Chi Minh City (ISHCMC), Ho Chi Minh City
 International School Saigon Pearl (ISSP), Ho Chi Minh City
 International School Ho Chi Minh City - American Academy (ISHCMC-AA), Ho Chi Minh City

Brazil
 PlayPen Bilingual Education, São Paulo 
 Instituto GayLussac, Niteroi, Rio de Janeiro
 Centro Educacional Pingo de Gente & Laviniense, Manus
 Colegio Maxi, Londrina, Paraná
 Maxi Global School, Paraná
 Escola Villare, São Caetano do Sul, Brazil

Chile
 Dunalastair School Chicureo
 Dunalastair School Las Condes
 Dunalastair School Peñalolén
 Colegio American British School, Santiago
 Colegio Manquecura Ciudad de Los Valles, Santiago
 Colegio Manquecura Ciudad del Este, Santiago
 Colegio Manquecura Valle lo Campino, Santiago
 Colegio Pumahue Chicauma, Santiago
 Colegio Pumahue Chicureo, Santiago
 Colegio Pumahue Curauma
 Colegio Pumahue Huechuraba, Santiago
 Colegio Pumahue Peñalolén, Santiago
 Colegio Pumahue Puerto Montt, Puerto Montt
 Colegio Pumahue Temuco, Temuco
 Colegio San Francisco Javier Huechuraba
 Colegio Manquecura de Ñuñoa, Santiago
 Greenland School, Santiago

India
 CHIREC International, Hyderabad

United Arab Emirates
 Horizon English School, Dubai
 Horizon International School, Dubai
 Ranches Primary School, Dubai
 Royal Grammar School Guildford, Dubai

United States 

 York Preparatory School, (New York), USA

Italy
 Kindergarten Bilingual School, Florence

Mexico 

 Colegio Olinca, Mexico City

Colombia 

 Bureche School (Redcol), Santa Marta
 Colegio Británico de Cartagena (Redcol), Cartagena
 Colegio La Arboleda (Redcol), Cali
 New Cambridge School – Cali (Redcol), Cali
 Colegio Santa Francisca Romana (Redcol), Bogotá
 Gimnasio del Norte (Redcol), Valledupar
 New Cambridge School (Redcol), Bucaramanga
 Newport School (Redcol), Bucaramanga
 Vermont School (Redcol), Medellín

References

External links
 Cognita official site

 
Companies based in Milton Keynes
Education in Milton Keynes
Education in the United Kingdom
Private school organisations in England
2004 establishments in England
Educational institutions established in 2004
Education companies of the United Kingdom